The Phantom Lodge is the second studio album by the Swedish black metal band Diabolical Masquerade. Dan Swanö played a much smaller part on this album than previously, doing heavy metal vocals on "Hater" only and assisting Blakkheim in producing. However, there were a few guest appearances.

Track listing

Personnel
 Blakkheim - guitars, bass guitar, programming, keyboard, vocals, producer, artwork, art director

Additional personnel
 Sean C. Bates - drums, percussion
 Dan Swanö - vocals on "Hater", producer, engineering, mixing
 Roger Öberg - vocals on "Astray Within the Coffinwood Mill"
 Igmar Dohn - bass on "Cloaked by the Moonshine Mist"
 Marie Gaard Engberg - flute on tracks 5 and 6
 Tina Sahlstedt - flute on tracks 5 and 6
 Jeroen van Valkenburg - artwork
 Jean-Pascal Fournier - cover art
 Peter in de Betou - mastering
 Mala - photography

References

1997 albums
Albums produced by Dan Swanö
Diabolical Masquerade albums
Albums with cover art by Jean-Pascal Fournier